Gandab-e Sofla (also Romanized as Gandāb-e Soflá and Gandab Sofla; also known as Gandāb-e Pā’īn and Kandāb Pāin) is a village in Chaharduli-ye Sharqi Rural District, Chaharduli District, Qorveh County, Kurdistan Province, Iran. At the 2006 census, its population was 203, in 59 families. The village is populated by Azerbaijanis.

References 

Towns and villages in Qorveh County
Azerbaijani settlements in Kurdistan Province